F107 or F-107 may refer to:

 HMS Rothesay (F107), a 1957 British Royal Navy Rothesay-class frigate
 Netz 107, an Israeli Air Force F-16 on display at the Israeli Air Force Museum
 North American F-107, a 1956 American supersonic military fighter prototype
 Williams F107, a small turbofan jet engine